The Crowd Roars may refer to:

The Crowd Roars (1932 film), directed by Howard Hawks and starring James Cagney
The Crowd Roars (1938 film), featuring Robert Taylor